Pseudomeritastis orphnoxantha is a species of moth of the family Tortricidae. It is found in Costa Rica.

The length of the forewings is about 8.5 mm. The forewings are light grey with brownish-ferruginous markings, edged and in part transversally strigulated (finely streaked) with dark brown. The hindwings are dark ferruginous.

Etymology
The species name is derived from the Greek words for dark and yellow.

References

Moths described in 1966
Euliini